Abdul Karim Chowdhury is an Indian politician and also was the past Minister for Mass Education Extension and Library Services in the Government of West Bengal. He was also an MLA, elected from the Islampur constituency in the 2011 West Bengal state assembly election.
Before this term he had been elected for 10 terms as MLA. He is one of the veteran leaders of West Bengal.
He is one of the vice presidents of All India Trinamool Congress West Bengal unit.

Chowdhury is a graduate from Siliguri College under the North Bengal University.

References

State cabinet ministers of West Bengal
Members of the West Bengal Legislative Assembly
Living people
Trinamool Congress politicians from West Bengal
People from Uttar Dinajpur district
1946 births
20th-century Bengalis
21st-century Bengalis
Bengali Muslims
University of North Bengal alumni